United Nations Security Council Resolution 2058 was unanimously adopted on 19 July 2012. Azerbaijan and Pakistan decided to abstain.

See also 
List of United Nations Security Council Resolutions 2001 to 2100

References

External links
Text of the Resolution at undocs.org

 2058
 2058
2012 in Cyprus
2010s in Cypriot politics
July 2012 events